Guillermo Calegari Sr. (born 13 September 1924) was an Argentine sailor. He competed in the Star event at the 1972 Summer Olympics.

References

External links
 

1924 births
Living people
Argentine male sailors (sport)
Olympic sailors of Argentina
Sailors at the 1972 Summer Olympics – Star
Sportspeople from Buenos Aires